The following is a list of production automobiles manufactured by Lamborghini, listed in chronological order. Only the main models are listed; sub-models (e.g. limited edition variants, roadster variants, etc.) are included with ”numbers produced”.

Current production models

Former production models

One-off and limited production models

See also
 List of Lamborghini concept vehicles

References

Lamborghini automobiles, List of